Jafarabad  may refer to:

Armenia
 Getashen, Armavir, Armenia, formerly called Jafarabad

Azerbaijan
 Aşağı Fərəcan, Azerbaijan, formerly called Jafarabad
 Cəfərabad, Jabrayil, Azerbaijan
 Cəfərabad, Shaki, Azerbaijan

India
 Jafarabad, Uttar Pradesh,  a town in Jaunpur district in the Indian state of Uttar Pradesh
 Jaffrabad, Delhi, a town in the state of Delhi, India
 Jaffrabad, Tamil Nadu, a town in the state of Tamil Nadu, India
 Jafrabad, a city and a municipality in Amreli District in the Indian state of Gujarat
 Jafrabad, Bhopal, a village in the Bhopal district of Madhya Pradesh, India
 Jafrabad, Jalna, a tehsil in Jalna district in the Indian state of Maharashtra
 Jafarabad State, a former princely state, located in the Kathiawar Peninsula on the Gujarat coast
 Jafrabad, Murshidabad, a census town in West Bengal

Pakistan
 Jafarabad, Hunza a town in Gilgit-Baltistan, Pakistan
 Jafarabad District, a district in Balochistan, Pakistan

Iran

Alborz Province
 Jafarabad, Alborz, Iran

Ardabil Province
 Jafarabad, Ardabil, a city in Bileh Savar County
 Jafarabad, Khalkhal, a village in Khalkhal County
 Jafarabad, Meshgin Shahr, a village in Meshgin Shahr County

Chaharmahal and Bakhtiari Province
 Jafarabad, Chaharmahal and Bakhtiari, a village in Kiar County

East Azerbaijan Province
 Jafarabad, Ahar, a village in Ahar County
 Jafarabad, Charuymaq, a village in Charuymaq County
 Jafarabad, Khoda Afarin, a village in Khoda Afarin County
 Jafarabad, Varzaqan, a village in Varzaqan County

Fars Province
Jafarabad, Arsanjan, a village in Arsanjan County
Jafarabad-e Olya, Fars, a village in Bavanat County
Jafarabad-e Sofla, Fars, a village in Bavanat County
Jafarabad, Forg, a village in Darab County
Jafarabad, Rostaq, a village in Darab County
Jafarabad, Eqlid, a village in Eqlid County
Jafarabad, Hasanabad, a village in Eqlid County
Jafarabad, Fasa, a village in Fasa County
Jafarabad, Now Bandegan, a village in Fasa County
Jafarabad, Kazerun, a village in Kazerun County
Jafarabad, Neyriz, a village in Neyriz County
Jafarabad, Qatruyeh, a village in Neyriz County
Jafarabad, alternate name of Mazraeh-ye Jafarabad, Fars, a village in Neyriz County
Jafarabad, Rostam, a village in Rostam County
Jafarabad, Sepidan, a village in Sepidan County

Gilan Province
 Jafarabad, Gilan, a village in Rasht County

Golestan Province
 Jafarabad, Golestan, a village in Gorgan County
 Jafarabad-e Namtalu, a village in Ramian County

Hamadan Province
 Jafarabad, Asadabad, a village in Asadabad County
 Jafarabad, Bahar, a village in Bahar County
 Jafarabad, Nahavand, a village in Nahavand County
 Jafarabad, alternate name of Zareabad, Hamadan, a village in Nahavand County
 Jafarabad, Razan, a village in Razan County

Hormozgan Province
 Jafarabad, Minab, a village in Mindab County
 Jafarabad, Tukahur, a village in Mindab County
 Jafarabad, Rudan, a village in Rudan County

Ilam Province
 Jafarabad, Darreh Shahr, a village in Darreh Shahr County
 Jafarabad, Ilam, a village in Ilam County

Isfahan Province
 Jafarabad, Ardestan, a village in Ardestan County
 Jafarabad, Zavareh, a village in Ardestan County
 Jafarabad, Khorram Dasht, a village in Kashan County
 Jafarabad, Khur and Biabanak, a village in Khur and Biabanak County
 Jafarabad, Lenjan, a village in Lenjan County
 Jafarabad, Tiran and Karvan, a village in Tiran and Karvan County

Kerman Province
 Jafarabad, Bardsir, a village in Bardsir County
 Jafarabad, Fahraj, a village in Fahraj County
 Jafarabad, Jiroft, a village in Jiroft County
 Jafarabad, Rafsanjan, a village in Rafsanjan County
 Jafarabad, Ferdows, a village in Rafsanjan County
 Jafarabad, Rigan, a village in Rigan County
 Jafarabad, Rudbar-e Jonubi, a village in Rudbar-e Jonubi County
 Jafarabad, Shahr-e Babak, a village in Shahr-e Babak County
 Jafarabad, Sharifabad, a village in Sirjan County
 Jafarabad, Zeydabad, a village in Sirjan County

Kermanshah Province
 Jafarabad, Kermanshah, a village in Kermanshah County
 Jafarabad, Kuzaran, a village in Kermanshah County
 Jafarabad, Sonqor, a village in Sonqor County

Khuzestan Province
 Jafarabad, Andika, a village in Andika County

Kurdistan Province
 Jafarabad, Bijar, a village in Bijar County
 Jafarabad, Chang Almas, a village in Bijar County
 Jafarabad, Dehgolan, a village in Dehgolan County
 Jafarabad, Divandarreh, a village in Divandarreh County

Lorestan Province
 Jafarabad, Borujerd, a village in Borujerd County
 Jafarabad, Delfan, a village in Delfan County
 Jafarabad, former name of Vanu, a village in Delfan County
Jafarabad-e Olya, Delfan, a village in Delfan County
Jafarabad-e Olya, Kakavand, a village in Delfan County
Jafarabad-e Sofla, Lorestan, a village in Delfan County
Jafarabad, Dowreh, a village in Dowreh County
Jafarabad, Kuhdasht, a village in Kuhdasht County
Jafarabad Khan-e Zeytun, a village in Kuhdasht County
Jafarabad, Selseleh, a village in Selseleh County
Jafarabad, Firuzabad, a village in Selseleh County
Jafarabad, alternate name of Posht-e Tang-e Firuzabad, a village in Selseleh County

Markazi Province
 Jafarabad, Ashtian, a village in Ashtian County
 Jafarabad, Khomeyn, a village in Khomeyn County
 Jafarabad, Saveh, a village in Saveh County

Mazandaran Province
 Jafarabad, Amol, a village in Amol County
 Jafarabad, Sari, a village in Sari County

North Khorasan Province
 Jafarabad, Bojnord, a village in Bojnord County
 Jafarabad, Esfarayen, a village in Esfarayen County
 Jafarabad-e Sofla, North Khorasan, a village in Faruj County

Qazvin Province
 Jafarabad, Qazvin

Qom Province
 Jafarabad, former name of Jafariyeh, a city in Qom Province, Iran
 Jafarabad, Qom, a village in Qom Province, Iran
 Jafarabad, Jafarabad, a village in Qom Province, Iran
 Jafarabad District (Iran), a district in Qom Province, Iran
 Jafarabad Rural District, a rural district in Qom Province, Iran

Razavi Khorasan Province
 Jafarabad, Fariman, a village in Fariman County
 Jafarabad, Gonabad, a village in Gonabad County
 Jafarabad, Khalilabad, a village in Khalilabad County
 Jafarabad, Nishapur, a village in Nishapur County
 Jafarabad-e Olya, Quchan Atiq, a village in Quchan County
 Jafarabad-e Olya, Sudlaneh, a village in Quchan County
 Jafarabad, Rashtkhvar, a village in Rashtkhvar County
 Jafarabad, Torbat-e Heydarieh, a village in Torbat-e Heydarieh County
 Jafarabad, Torbat-e Jam, a village in Torbat-e Jam County
 Jafarabad, Zaveh, a village in Zaveh County

Semnan Province
 Jafarabad, Semnan, a village in Shahrud County
 Jafarabad, Beyarjomand, a village in Shahrud County

Sistan and Baluchestan Province
 Jafarabad, Bampur, a village in Bampur County
 Jafarabad, Khash, a village in Khash County

South Khorasan Province
 Jafarabad, Khusf, a village in Khusf County
 Jafarabad, Qaen, a village in Qaen County
 Jafarabad, Sedeh, a village in Qaen County
 Jafarabad, Tabas, a village in Tabas County

Tehran Province
 Jafarabad, Tehran, a village in Damavand County
 Jafarabad-e Akhavan, a village in Varamin County
 Jafarabad-e Baqeraf, a village in Tehran County
 Jafarabad-e Jangal, Damavand, a village in Damavand County
 Jafarabad-e Jangal, Tehran, a village in Tehran County
 Jafarabad-e Jangal, Varamin, a village in Varamin County

West Azerbaijan Province
 Jafarabad, Khoy, a village in Khoy County
 Jafarabad, Marhemetabad-e Jonubi, a village in Miandoab County
 Jafarabad, Mokriyan-e Shomali, a village in Miandoab County
 Jafarabad, Zarrineh Rud-e Shomali, a village in Miandoab County
 Jafarabad, Showt, a village in Showt County

Yazd Province
 Jafarabad, Behabad, a village in Behabad County
 Jafarabad, Khatam, a village in Khatam County

See also 
 Jafar (disambiguation)
 Jafarpur, a census town in West Bengal, India